Lies of Love is a 1949 short Italian documentary film directed by Michelangelo Antonioni. It was entered into the 1949 Cannes Film Festival.

Cast
 Annie O'Hara
 Sergio Raimondi
 Sandro Roberti
 Anna Vita

References

External links

1949 films
1940s Italian-language films
Italian short documentary films
Italian black-and-white films
Films directed by Michelangelo Antonioni
1949 documentary films
Black-and-white documentary films
1949 short films
1940s Italian films
1940s short documentary films